Joel Walker may refer to:
Joel Walker (snooker player) (born 1994), English snooker player
Joel Walker (sculptor), English sculptor

See also
Joel Walker Sweeney (1810–1860), American musician and early blackface minstrel performer
 Joe Walker (disambiguation)